Helga Göring (1922–2010) was a German stage, television and film actress.

Selected filmography
 Castles and Cottages (1957)
 Two Mothers (1957)
 Sheriff Teddy (1957)
 Erich Kubak (1959)
 The Second Track (1962)
 Minna von Barnhelm (1962)
 Follow Me, Scoundrels (1964)
 Trace of Stones (1966)
 No Place to Go (2000), as Hanna's mother

Series
 Geschichten uebern Gartenzaun (1982-1985)

References

Bibliography
 Stephen Brockmann. A Critical History of German Film. Camden House, 2010.

External links

1922 births
2010 deaths
German film actresses
German stage actresses
German television actresses
East German actors
East German women
20th-century German women